"Thank You Darling" is a song by the American music group The Supremes. Released exclusively in Europe, it is one of two Supremes singles sung in German, the first being "Moonlight and Kisses". Both singles were written by Werner Scharfenberger and Fini Busch. The b-side "Jonny Und Joe", is based on their earlier single, "Come See About Me", with German lyrics by Kurt Feltz. "Thank You Darling" became The Supremes' fourth top-twenty hit on the German Singles Chart.

Released as a non-album single, both sides later appeared on numerous compilations including, Motown Around the World: The Classic Singles (2010), More Hits by The Supremes: Expanded Edition (2011) and the box set, 50th Anniversary: The Singles Collection 1961–1969 (2011).

Charts

References

The Supremes songs
1965 songs
1965 singles
Motown singles
Songs written by Werner Scharfenberger
Songs written by Fini Busch